Simmie is a hamlet in Bone Creek Rural Municipality No. 108, Saskatchewan, Canada. Listed as a designated place by Statistics Canada, the hamlet had a population of 41 in the Canada 2016 Census. The hamlet is located on Highway 343 and Highway 631, about 50 km southwest of Swift Current.

Demographics 

See also 
 List of communities in Saskatchewan
 Hamlets of Saskatchewan

References 

Bone Creek No. 108, Saskatchewan
Designated places in Saskatchewan
Hamlets in Saskatchewan
Division No. 4, Saskatchewan